WXBB (94.7 MHz) is a commercial FM radio station in Erie, Pennsylvania.  It is branded as "94.7 Bob FM" and carries an adult hits format as of January 5, 2007. The station is owned by iHeartMedia. WXBB's studios are located in the Boston Store building in downtown Erie while its transmitter is located near Peach Street and Sesame Street south of I-90.

History
The "94.7 Bob FM" branding replaced WFGO "Froggy 94.7" on January 5, 2007.  Froggy 94.7 was one of the Froggy stations that neither carried country music nor used fictitious frog-themed names for its disc jockeys.

The present-day WXBB call sign was previously assigned to what is now WSAK/WSHK in Hampton New Hampshire.

WXBB can also be heard in Ashtabula, Ohio, and surrounding areas.

The station airs the syndicated Valentine In The Morning from KBIG in Los Angeles via iHeartMedia's Premium Choice network. 

On March 27, 2019, Connoisseur Media announced that it would transfer WXBB along with its sister stations to iHeartMedia in exchange for WFRE and WFMD in the Frederick, Maryland market from the Aloha Station Trust. The sale closed on May 20, 2019.

References

External links

Erie Media Blog on 94.7 FM 

Bob FM stations
Adult hits radio stations in the United States
XBB
Radio stations established in 1993
1993 establishments in Pennsylvania
IHeartMedia radio stations